Vänner is Swedish for "friends" and may refer to:-

Bästa vänner (Best friends), a 1997 album from Swedish pop singer Lena Philipsson.
Riltons Vänner (Rilton's Friends), a Swedish professional a cappella group
Vänner och fiender (Friends and Foes), a Swedish soap opera

 Vanner  may also refer to a historic ore-dressing machine
 Vanner (band), a South Korean boy band